Hercospora is a genus of fungi within the Diaporthales order, class Sordariomycetes. The relationship of this taxon to other taxa within the order is unknown (incertae sedis).

Species
Hercospora ahmadii
Hercospora binoculata
Hercospora carpini
Hercospora circumscissa
Hercospora concinna
Hercospora coryli
Hercospora digitifera
Hercospora erythropyrenia
Hercospora kornhuberi
Hercospora magnoliae-acuminatae
Hercospora nigrescens
Hercospora stromatica
Hercospora tiliae

References

Sordariomycetes genera
Diaporthales